Klaus-Dieter Ludwig, known as Lucky in rowing circles (2 January 1943 – 18 May 2016), was a German coxswain who competed for East Germany in the 1972 Summer Olympics and in the 1980 Summer Olympics. He had a long rowing career and competed on the international stage for 19 seasons, retiring aged 41.

Biography
He was born in 1943 in Züllichau, at the time located in Germany but since the end of World War II part of Poland. He started rowing in 1958 at age 15 but after two or three years, he became a coxswain instead. At 170 cm, he was tall for a cox but he suppressed hunger by heavy smoking to keep his weight at 55 kg, the minimum weight for that role. He competed for the SG Dynamo Potsdam / Sportvereinigung (SV) Dynamo.

Ludwig's first international race was at the 1966 World Rowing Championships in Bled where he won gold with the coxed four.

In 1972 he coxed the East German boat that won the gold medal in the coxed four event. In 1973 he won a silver medal at the European Rowing Championships in Moscow. At the 1980 Olympics he won the gold medal with the East German boat in the men's eight competition. He retired from competitive rowing—aged 41 and after 19 international rowing seasons—after winning silver with the men's eight at the 1984 Friendship Games, dubbed the "alternative Olympics".

Skipping meals, heavy smoking and alcohol consumption took a toll on Ludwig's health. He lived in a care facility since the end of 2015. Shortly before he died on 18 May 2016 he had his stomach removed.

References 

  RRK 08 Rudern – Deutsche Rudererfolge bei Olympia

External links
 

1943 births
2016 deaths
People from Sulechów
People from the Province of Brandenburg
Coxswains (rowing)
Olympic rowers of East Germany
Rowers at the 1972 Summer Olympics
Rowers at the 1980 Summer Olympics
Olympic gold medalists for East Germany
Olympic silver medalists for East Germany
Olympic medalists in rowing
East German male rowers
World Rowing Championships medalists for East Germany
Medalists at the 1980 Summer Olympics
Medalists at the 1972 Summer Olympics
European Rowing Championships medalists